The Libel Act 1843, commonly known as Lord Campbell's Libel Act, was an Act of the Parliament of the United Kingdom. It enacted several important codifications of and modifications to the common law tort of libel.

This Act was repealed for the Republic of Ireland by section 4 of, and Part 2 of Schedule 1 to, the Defamation Act, 1961.

Preamble
The preamble was repealed by the Statute Law Revision Act 1891.

Section 3 - Publishing or threatening to publish a libel, or proposing to abstain from publishing any thing, with intent to extort money, punishable by imprisonment and hard labour
This section was repealed by the Schedule to the Larceny Act 1916.

Section 4 - Publication of libel known to be false
This section formerly provided:

This section was repealed for England and Wales and Northern Ireland by section 178 of, and Part 2 of Schedule 23, to the Coroners and Justice Act 2009.

This section was replaced for the Republic of Ireland by section 12 of the Defamation Act, 1961.

Alternative verdict

See Boaler v R (1888) 21 QBD 284, (1888) 16 Cox 488, (1888) 4 TLR 565

Section 5 - Publication of libel
This section formerly provided:

This section did not create or define an offence. It provided the penalty for the existing common law offence of defamatory libel.

This section was repealed for England and Wales and Northern Ireland by section 178 of, and Part 2 of Schedule 23, to the Coroners and Justice Act 2009. The repeal of this section was consequential on the abolition of the common law offence of defamatory libel by section 73(b) of that Act.

This section was replaced for the Republic of Ireland by section 11 of the Defamation Act, 1961.

Section 6 - Defence of truth and public benefit against defamatory libel
This section allowed the defendant to prove the truth of a libel as a valid defence in criminal proceedings, but only if it also be demonstrated that publication of the libel was to the "Public Benefit". Proving the statement's truth had previously been allowed only in civil libel defences inasmuch as the criminal offence against the public at large was considered to be provoking a breach of peace via printing malicious statements rather than the defamation per se; the truth or falsity of the statement had therefore been considered irrelevant in criminal proceedings before the Act.

This section was repealed for England and Wales and Northern Ireland by section 178 of, and Part 2 of Schedule 23, to the Coroners and Justice Act 2009.

This section was replaced for the Republic of Ireland by section 6 of the Defamation Act, 1961.

This section did not apply to seditious libel.

Section 7 - Evidence to rebut prima facie case of publication by an agent
In England and Wales and Northern Ireland, this section now reads:

The words in square brackets were inserted by section 177 of, and paragraph 66 of Schedule 21 to, the Coroners and Justice Act 2009.

This section was replaced for the Republic of Ireland by section 7 of the Defamation Act, 1961.

This section, in its original form, applied to a prosecution for blasphemous libel.

Section 8 - Reimbursement of defence expenses upon acquittal
This section permitted a defendant who had been charged by a private prosecutor to recover the costs of his legal defence if found not guilty.

This section was repealed by the Schedule to the Costs in Criminal Cases Act 1908.

Oscar Wilde was bankrupted under this provision when he abandoned his libel prosecution against Lord Queensberry and was ordered to reimburse him for the considerable expenses Queensberry had incurred for legal representation and private detectives.

See also
Libel Act
Defamation Act

References
Halsbury's Statutes

External links
The Libel Act 1843, as amended from the National Archives.
The Libel Act 1843, as originally enacted from the National Archives.

United Kingdom Acts of Parliament 1843
United Kingdom defamation law